Eupsilobiidae is a family of beetles in the superfamily Coccinelloidea, formerly included within the family Endomychidae. Most genera are restricted to the Neotropics, while the genus Eidoreus is found worldwide. They are fungivores, and have been observed living commensally in bee and ant nests.

Genera
 Cerasommatidia Brèthes, 1925
 Chileolobius Pakaluk & Ślipiński, 1990
 Eidoreus Sharp, 1885
 Evolocera Sharp, 1902
 Ibicarella Pakaluk & Ślipiński, 1990
 Microxenus Wollaston, 1861 – South Africa
 Natalinus Tomaszewska, 2011 – South Africa

References

Further reading

 
 
 
 
 
 
 
 
 
 
 

Coccinelloidea
Polyphaga families